Gilberto Bosques Saldívar (20 July 1892 – 4 July 1995) was a Mexican diplomat and before that a militant in the Mexican Revolution and a leftist legislator. As a consul in Marseille, Vichy France, Bosques took initiative to rescue tens of thousands of Jews and Spanish Republican exiles from being deported to Nazi Germany or Spain, but his heroism remained unknown to the world at large for some sixty years, until several years after his death at the age of 102 (not 103, as sometimes reported). For about two decades after World War II, Bosques served as Mexico's ambassador to several countries. Since 2003, international recognition has been accruing to him. In 1944, he described his efforts thus: "I followed the policy of my country, of material and moral support to the heroic defenders of the Spanish Republic, the stalwart paladins of the struggle against Hitler, Mussolini, Franco, Petain, and Laval."

Early years, family and education
Gilberto Bosques Saldívar was born in Chiautla, a mountain village in southern portion of the state of Puebla, southeast of Mexico City.

At age 17, he took up arms in the Mexican Revolution under the command of Aquiles Serdán Alatriste, the first martyr of the Revolution.

Career

Journalism and politics
Bosques organized the First National Pedagogy Congress (Primer Congreso Nacional Pedagógico), and he worked as a journalist with several newspapers and publications.

He subsequently served as a state legislator in Puebla and as a federal deputy on two occasions: 1922–23 and again in 1934–37. In the latter period, he belonged to a bloc of legislators supporting the new president, general Lázaro Cárdenas (1934–40). He was the President of the Chamber of Deputies in 1935. In 1938, he was the director of the government owned newspaper, El Nacional.

Mexican Consul in France
Bosques was stationed in France from 1939–43, coinciding with most of World War II, initially as Mexico's Consul General. Fleeing the German occupation of Paris in May 1940, Bosques was instructed by his government to organize a consulate to represent Mexico in Vichy France, which he set up in Marseille. Once Nazi Germany had occupied France and entrusted much of the governance of the country to Vichy France, he directed consular employees to issue a visa to anybody wanting to flee to Mexico. Under his auspices, visas were issued to approximately 40,000 people, mostly Jews and Spaniards. The Spaniards rescued were refugees from Francoist Spain after the conclusion of the Spanish Civil War in April 1939. Bosques rented a castle and a summer holiday camp in Marseilles to house refugees under the protection of what he maintained was Mexican territory under international law.

Bosques' courageous initiatives and actions mirror those of two other consuls placed in similar situations in war-torn Europe, such as the Portuguese consul Aristides de Sousa Mendes in Bordeaux, France, and the Japanese consul Chiune Sugihara in Kaunas, Lithuania.

In 1943, Bosques, his family (wife and three children), and 40 consular staff members were arrested by the Gestapo and detained in a "hotel-prison" in Germany for a year. He was released under an agreement between the German and Mexican governments after Manuel Ávila Camacho (then President of Mexico from 1940–46) made an exchange of prisoners with imprisoned German citizens.

Post-World War II
Bosques and his family returned to Mexico in 1944.

In the decades after his release from German captivity, he served as Ambassador of Mexico in several countries: Portugal, Finland, Sweden and Cuba. In 1962, during the Cuban Missile Crisis, Bosques — who was both a personal friend of Fidel Castro and the diplomatic representative of a neutral country trusted by the United States, the Soviet Union and Cuba, worked to facilitate communications between the disputants and bring Cuba into agreement with the "face-saving" agreements worked out between the two nuclear powers.

Personal life and death
Bosques was married and had three children: Laura, María Teresa and Gilberto Froylán. In his retirement in Mexico, he translated and wrote poetry.

Bosques Saldívar died just days short of his 103rd birthday.

Legacy and recognition
Bosques's feat in saving nearly 40,000 people from execution by the Third Reich or Francoist Spain went unrecognized even among specialists in the history of rescuers of Jews until after 2000, and especially the year 2008. At a ceremony in Beverly Hills, California, on 13 November 2008, the Anti-Defamation League (ADL) posthumously awarded him the Courage to Care Award, created in 1987 to honor rescuers of Jews during the Holocaust Era.  But this was not the first major posthumous recognition given to him. He was memorialized in Vienna on 4 June 2003 by having a street in the 22nd district named after him: the Gilberto-Bosques-Promenade.

In 2007, Embajador Gilberto Bosques: un hombre de todos los tiempos (Ambassador Gilberto Bosques: a man for all times), a photographic exhibition in his honor, was mounted at the Jewish and Holocaust History Museum in the Condesa neighborhood in Mexico City. In 2008, this exhibition traveled to Xalapa, Veracruz.

On 20 July 2017, Google celebrated his 125th birthday with a Google Doodle.

Lillian Lieberman's 2010 documentary Visa to Paradise (Visa al paraíso) is based on Bosques' life.

See also
 Mexican Jews

Notes

References

Bibliography

External links
Memorial site  
 Testimonials from people saved by Bosques, collected by the International Raoul Wallenberg Foundation

1892 births
1995 deaths
Mexican centenarians
People who rescued Jews during the Holocaust
Presidents of the Chamber of Deputies (Mexico)
People from Puebla
Ambassadors of Mexico to Finland
Ambassadors of Mexico to Portugal
Ambassadors of Mexico to Sweden
Ambassadors of Mexico to Cuba
Men centenarians
People of the Mexican Revolution